Mukaida (written: 向田, 向井田 and 迎田) is a Japanese surname. Notable people with the surname include:

, Japanese make-up artist and businesswoman
, Japanese sport wrestler

Japanese-language surnames